The Danish bicycle VIN-system is a system introduced in 1942 by the Danish government, providing all bicycles in Denmark with a unique code. The VIN code is a combination of letters and digits embedded into the bicycle frame and consists of a manufacturer code, a serial number, and construction year code.

Since 1948, it has been illegal to sell bicycle frames in Denmark without an embedded VIN. Because of this, insurance companies in Denmark will not pay indemnities for stolen bicycles without a VIN.

Location of the VIN 
By default, the VIN is to be engraved into the seat tube or the down tube, but if these are made of such a material that hinders this, it may alternately be put on the bottom bracket shell. In very special instances, and only with the approval of the Danish National Police Commissioner’s Office, it may be applied by other means and on other locations.

Components of the VIN 
The bicycle VIN is constructed of three elements: a letter-block, a digit-block and a letter-block:

The manufacturers-code, is a 1, 2, 3 or 4-letter block. If the code starts with a W, it is an imported bicycle frame. The second block is the frame serial number from that manufacturer. This shall have at least one digit, but can otherwise have any number of digits. The third block is a single letter code that identifies the production year. Certain limits regarding letters are instated for the VIN:
 I is omitted as it can be confused with 1 (one)
 O is omitted as it can be confused with 0 (zero)
 Y is omitted as it can be confused with V
 W is omitted, to avoid confusion with the manufacturer code (where W is reserved for imported frames)

In the examples above, the first bicycle is a bicycle imported by FDB, with serial number 1234 and made in either 1963, 1984 or 2005. The second bike is an SCO bicycle, with serial number 57, made in 1942, 1964, 1985 or 2006.

Common manufacturer codes 
This table shows examples of manufacturer codes, but is in no way to be considered a complete listing.

1: Even though I in general is not used, it appears that some brands are using it.
2: Even though I in general is not used, Ebsen Danmark A/S bicycles are in fact using it in their manufacturercode (verified).
3: Even though W in general is not used, it appears that some brands are using it.

Raleigh Variant 
An example of a different manufacturers code system has been found on a 1954 Raleigh. In this example, the WAR prefix (W:Import,AR:Raleigh) is instead represented by WN with a smaller font BY. The WN section is a previously reported variant, presumed to be earlier than the AR listed above, but the extra BY stamped in a much smaller and different font is not. 
This BY stamp matches the frame number prefix stamped by Raleigh on the frame at the time of manufacture. That system (for export frames) was a rolling alphabetical progression which began at AA1 and ticked over to AB1 as the number reached AA99999. At AZ99999 it went to BA1 and so on.
This progression reached BY in 1954. So, it is now quite clear that the BY variant in the Danish VIN serial was simply the prefix of the Raleigh stamped frame number, which at some point was abandoned in favour of the standard Raleigh code AR.

Production year identification codes 
Please note that since this table was compiled, a Q has been found on a Raleigh frame made in March 1978. This obviously calls into question the entries for letters R to Z but also confirms the years for A to P are accurate.

See also 
 Bicycle locker
 Bicycle theft
 List of bicycle registers
 Outline of cycling

References 

Bicycle parts
Bicycle registry
Identifiers
1942 introductions
Cycling in Denmark
Vehicle security systems